Center Lovell is an unincorporated village in the town of Lovell, Oxford County, Maine, United States. The community is located along Maine State Route 5 near the east bank of the Kezar River. Center Lovell has a post office with ZIP code 04016, which opened on May 9, 1848.

References

Villages in Oxford County, Maine
Villages in Maine